Apaharan (English: Abduction) is a 2005 Indian Hindi-language crime action film directed by Prakash Jha and stars Ajay Devgn, Bipasha Basu and Nana Patekar in the lead roles. It is the story of a complex relationship and clashing ideologies between a father and son set in the backdrop of the kidnapping industry in the eastern state of Bihar, India. Apaharan was declared semi Hit at the Indian box-office.

Plot
Ajay Shastri (Ajay Devgn) is an unemployed, honest graduate who dreams of joining the police force. His father, Raghuvansh Shastri (Mohan Agashe) is a highly principled and moralistic man. An ex-schoolteacher and Gandhi follower, now a social activist, Prof. Shastri expects his son to follow in his steps and believe in his ideals and values. When his father's ideals start clashing with Ajay's ideologies, a rift between father and son emerges.

Ajay borrows a lot of money, with the help of his friend (Ayub Khan) and bribes higher officials to get his name on the police force merit list. When Ajay's father discloses the corruption scandal to the media, things go awry, and left with pressure from his creditors, Ajay and his friend decide to kidnap a government official to repay the amount.

The kidnapping goes wrong at the last minute. It turns out that the victim is under protection of Gaya Singh (Yashpal Sharma), one of Tabrez Alam's (Nana Patekar) henchmen. Tabrez Alam is a powerful MLA and influential Muslim party leader, who is also an underworld don and controller of a large kidnapping racket.

Ajay and his friends are brought to jail. Gaya Singh and his men assault and humiliate Ajay and his friends, for meddling in their racket. Ajay pleads with the DSP, Shukla, to save him, who has recently developed strained relations with Gaya Singh due to severe conflict of opinions. DSP Shukla helps Ajay and his friends escape jail.

Ajay then kidnaps Sooraj Mal, one of the leading businessman and a rising figure in local politics, who was for long, a target of Tabrez Alam and Gaya Singh, but neither could do the job because of the high security provided to him. Gaya Singh goes frantic upon learning about the kidnapping and is on the lookout of killer. DSP Shukla and Ajay join forces and lure Gaya Singh into a trap. Gaya Singh heads to a location where Ajay is told to be hiding. Gaya Singh soon learns that he has been trapped and Ajay kills him after a brief fight. He surrenders himself to Tabrez, and requests him to recruit him into his gang. Tabrez sees potential in Ajay and allows him to be a part of his gang. Ajay starts working hard and rapidly rises in the ranks of Tabrez's empire. He takes Ajay in and places him higher than his own brother Usmaan (Mukul Nag), with an ulterior motive. Swimming in power, Ajay becomes the state's most powerful gangster and, under Tabrez's authority, the head of Bihar's most successful kidnapping trade, which Ajay consolidates by killing smaller players and removing all competitors.

The state's home minister's wife is caught on camera taking money and the scandal becomes the hottest news. The home minister offers Ajay to leave Tabrez Alam and join forces with him. He then provides the taped conversation between him and Ajay (which he surreptitiously records) to Tabrez to create differences between them. Meanwhile, news correspondent Akash Ranjan calls a press conference to clarify the scandal involving the home minister inviting a discussion. Tabrez sends Ajay to kill Akash so that he would bring a no-confidence motion against the government, bringing its fall. He would come to power by taking advantage of the political instability. Ajay is contacted by SP Anwar Khan who makes him aware of Tabrez's real motive. Ajay reaches the press conference venue only to find out that the real person behind the ongoing debate of bribery scandal is his father. He leaves without killing Akash Ranjan and is confronted by DSP Shukla, who is sent by Tabrez Alam to kill Ajay, but Ajay manages to kill Shukla and escape.

Ajay surrenders himself to SP Khan and gives his statement revealing everything about Tabrez Alam's illegal activities. This report is presented to the home minister by the commissioner of police citing Tabrez Alam's arrest warrant. The home minister makes a deal with Tabrez Alam, to destroy the evidence against him in exchange for money and power, and both join hands to form new government in the state with the help of their respective MLA support. SP Khan is sorry for Ajay as all his efforts are ruined by the political upheaval. Ajay goes home one last time with the help from SP Khan where he watches his father reminiscing about him and make amends with him after knowing how much he loved him. He goes back to prison where Tabrez comes to meet him after becoming the new home minister of the state. He gloats in front of Ajay at the jail. Ajay suddenly takes out his pistol and guns down Tabrez. Upon hearing then gunshots, Tabrez's men enter the room and shoot Ajay, bringing an end to their lives.

Cast

 Ajay Devgn as Ajay Shastri
 Nana Patekar as Tabrez Alam
 Ayub Khan as Kashinath
 Murli Sharma as Muralidhar
 Bipasha Basu as Megha Basu
 Khalid Siddiqui as Kamal Kishore
 Yashpal Sharma as Gaya Singh
 Mohan Agashe as Professor Raghuvansh Shastri
 Mukesh Tiwari as SP Anwar Khan
Daya Shankar Pandey as Daya Shankar
 Akhilendra Mishra as Brijnath Mishra (Chief Minister)
 Chetan Pandit as Dinkar Pandey (Home Minister)
 Prithvi Zutshi as Dwarka
 Saurabh Dubey as Anil Shrivastava
 Sanjay Swaraj as Seth Chandmal
 Ashwini Kalsekar as Mrs. Khan, Anwar Khan's Wife
 Anup Soni as Akash Ranjan, Press Media Reporter of Aaj Tak
 Pankaj Tripathi as Gaya Singh's Crony
  Ehsaan Khan as DSP Veerendra Shukla
 Anil Yadav as Naga
 Deepak Bhatia as Ramdhani Singh
 Brij Gopal as Jagannath Mandal
 Radhakrishna Dutta as Seth Soorajmal
 Mukul Nag as Usman
 Padam Singh as Dharam Singh
 Mrinalini Sharma as Sonia
 Vikram Sahu as Megha's Father
 Jayashankar Tripathi as Bankalal's brother in law
 Arvind Pandey as Sukhi Chacha
 Shreechand Makhija as Buchchi Kaka , Professor Shastri Servant
 Yusuf Hussain as Tabrez's Advocate

Music
"Aaiye, aao ji babu – Sapna Mukherjee, K. K.
Composer: Aadesh Shrivastav

Awards
2006 National Film Awards (India)
 Best Screenplay – Prakash Jha, Manoj Tyagi and Shridhar Raghavan
Filmfare Awards
 Best Dialogue – Prakash Jha
 Best Villain – Nana Patekar

External links

References

2005 films
2000s Hindi-language films
Films directed by Prakash Jha
Films about organised crime in India
Films set in Bihar
Films scored by Aadesh Shrivastava
Crime in Bihar
Films whose writer won the Best Original Screenplay National Film Award